The Community Justice (Scotland) Act 2016 is an Act of the Scottish Parliament passed in February 2016 to make provision for new community justice arrangements. The Act established a new national body to oversee community justice and it introduced requirements about achieving outcomes that were set locally and nationally.

History
The bill was introduced on 7 May 2015 by Michael Matheson, the Cabinet Secretary for Justice.

In September 2015, a report was publisher by the Ministerial Group on Offender Reintegration. There bill was also some flexibility introduced around the date of release, to better match available support in the community.

The justice committee considered how the legislation might make provision for 32 local community planning partnerships (CPPs) taking on new responsibilities without any new funding for them to do this. The legislation established a new national body, Community Justice Scotland.

The legislation was passed unanimously on 11 February 2016.

It received Royal Assent on 21 March 2016.

References

External links
 Progress of the bill at Scottish Parliament

Acts of the Scottish Parliament 2016
Penal system in Scotland
Crime prevention